Eklavya Technology Channel is a distant learning joint initiative between the IIT and IGNOU. It was inaugurated by Prof. Murli Manohar Joshi, Honourable Minister, HRD, S&T and Ocean Development on 26 January 2003.

The objective of this initiative is to bring to the audience the actual IIT classrooms virtually at their door steps. It is a channel dedicated to technical education and shall run programs generated at different IITs. The channel is designed to carry video courses in different disciplines generated at various IITs on weekdays and special interest programs on Sundays. Currently, eight complete courses are being run in parallel, contributed by IIT Delhi, IIT Kharagpur and IIT Madras and are repeated in the same sequence without a break.

Satellite Information

References

External links 
 Eklavya Technology Channel

Hindi-language television channels in India
Television channels and stations established in 1999
Distance education in India
2003 establishments in India